Liberty Township is an inactive township in Cole County, in the U.S. state of Missouri.

Liberty Township was erected in the 1820s, taking its name from Liberty, Missouri.

Liberty Township most likely was named for the American ideal of liberty.

References

Townships in Missouri
Townships in Cole County, Missouri
Jefferson City metropolitan area